Willie C. Frazier (June 19, 1942 – September 5, 2013) was an American collegiate and professional American football tight end.   He spent three stints with the Houston Oilers over a 10-year career in the AFL and NFL and was one of the 4,000-plus plaintiffs in the concussions-related lawsuit against the NFL that was tentatively settled for $765 million a week before his death.

At 6'4", 225 lbs. from Arkansas AM&N (now University of Arkansas at Pine Bluff), Frazier played 10 seasons from 1964–1975, all in the American Football League or the American Football Conference of the National Football League.

Frazier also played tight end for the San Diego Chargers and the Kansas City Chiefs between 1964 and 1972 and in 1975.

Born in Eldorado, Ark., Frazier played at Arkansas-Pine Bluff and joined the AFL's Oilers in 1964. He also played for the Chargers from 1966 through 1970, split the 1971 season between the Chiefs and Oilers and played for Kansas City in 1972 before a final season with Houston in 1975.

He played in 121 games with 209 catches for 3,088 yards, scoring 38 touchdowns, and was selected for the AFL All-Star Game in 1965, 1967 and 1969, winning all-AFL honors with the Oilers in 1965.

See also
List of American Football League players

External links
 Ex-Oilers TE Frazier dies at 71

1942 births
2013 deaths
People from El Dorado, Arkansas
American football tight ends
Arkansas–Pine Bluff Golden Lions football players
San Diego Chargers players
Houston Oilers players
Kansas City Chiefs players
American Football League All-Star players
Houston Texans (WFL) players
San Antonio Wings players
American Football League players